Amphilogia is a genus of fungi within the family Cryphonectriaceae.

External links

Diaporthales
Sordariomycetes genera